Romanaria cedrana is a species of moth of the family Tortricidae. It is found in Peru.

The wingspan is 26 mm. The ground colour of the forewings is cream, mostly mixed with yellowish. The suffusions are yellowish ferruginous and the marginal dots are brown. The hindwings are cream.

Etymology
The species name refers to El Cedro, the type locality.

References

Moths described in 2010
Euliini
Taxa named by Józef Razowski
Moths of South America